Luncșoara may refer to several places in Romania:

 Luncșoara, a village in Hălmăgel Commune, Arad County
 Luncșoara, a village in Aușeu Commune, Bihor County
 Luncșoara, a village in Vorța Commune, Hunedoara County
 Luncșoara, a village in Broșteni Commune, Mehedinți County
 Luncșoara (Hălmăgel), a river in Arad County
 Luncșoara, a tributary of the river Cozd in Brașov County

See also 
 Lunca (disambiguation)
 Luncile (disambiguation)
 Luncani (disambiguation)
 Luncavița (disambiguation)